The 2014 Johan Cruyff Shield was the nineteenth edition of the Johan Cruyff Shield, an annual Dutch football match played between the winners of the previous season's Eredivisie and KNVB Cup. The match was contested by PEC Zwolle, the 2013–14 KNVB Cup winners, and Ajax, champions of the 2013–14 Eredivisie. It was held at the Amsterdam Arena on 3 August 2014. PEC Zwolle won the match 1–0.

Coincidentally, the match was a repeat of last season's KNVB Cup final, which PEC Zwolle emphatically won 5–1, despite conceding early and major crowd disturbance from Ajax fans in the crowd at De Kuip (home of Ajax' rivals Feyenoord).

Match

References

 

2014
Joh
Johan Cruijff Schaal
Johan Cruijff Schaal
Johan Cruyff Shield